Magnar Lussand (18 July 1945 – 24 September 2019) was a Norwegian school principal and politician for the Centre Party.

He was born in Lussand, Ullensvang, and after graduating from teachers' college in 1971 he spent six years as a teacher in Kinsarvik. From 1977 he was an inspector and principal in the neighboring municipality of Granvin.

Lussand was a member of Ullensvang municipal council from 1976 to 1977, Granvin 
municipal council from 1980 to 1991, and Hordaland county council from 1984. He served as the mayor of Granvin. In 1991 Lussand became county mayor (fylkesordfører) of Hordaland. He was succeeded by Gisle Handeland in 1999, who was the first Labour Party representative to hold this position.

He served as a deputy representative to the Parliament of Norway from Hordaland during the term 1997–2001. In total he met during 38 days of parliamentary session. He died in 2019.

References

1945 births
2019 deaths
People from Ullensvang
People from Granvin
Heads of schools in Norway
Mayors of places in Hordaland
Centre Party (Norway) politicians
Chairmen of County Councils of Norway
Deputy members of the Storting